Phillip Donald Perlo (1935-1993) was an American football linebacker who played one season (1960) with the Houston Oilers of the American Football League. He played college football at the University of Maryland and attended Theodore Roosevelt High School (Washington, D.C.)

Biography
Phil Perlo was born December 6, 1935 in Washington, D.C., son of Abraham Perlo and Eva Orleans Perlo. Married Sue Gwen Ginsberg Perlo.

Early life
Phil Perlo is recognized as one of the best football players to emerge from the Washington, D.C. metropolitan area.  In his senior year at Theodore Roosevelt High School (Washington, D.C.).  Perlo, as quarterback and linebacker, led his team to the City Championship . The only Jewish player recruited by coach Jim Tatum of the University of Maryland, where he was the starting linebacker and fullback on the 1956 Maryland championship team that went to the Orange Bowl.

Career
In 1960, the Houston Oilers recruited Perlo (no.56) as their starting linebacker. After major injury in his first season, Perlo’s sports career was ended. Phil Perlo was inducted in the Pro Football Hall of Fame in 1992.

Death
Died in December 11, 1993 in Houston, Texas. Buried in Washington, DC.

References

External links
Just Sports Stats
College stats

1935 births
1993 deaths
Players of American football from Washington, D.C.
American football linebackers
Maryland Terrapins football players
Houston Oilers players
American Football League players